Predpankeyevsky is a rural locality (a settlement) in Ivanchikovsky Selsoviet Rural Settlement, Lgovsky District, Kursk Oblast, Russia. Population:

Geography 
The settlement is located on the Prutishche River in the basin of the Seym, 64 km from the Russia–Ukraine border, 55 km north-west of Kursk, 15 km north-east of the district center – the town Lgov, 4.5 km from the selsoviet center – Ivanchikovo.

 Climate
Predpankeyevsky has a warm-summer humid continental climate (Dfb in the Köppen climate classification).

Transport 
Predpankeyevsky is located 17.5 km from the road of regional importance  (Kursk – Lgov – Rylsk – border with Ukraine) as part of the European route E38, 9.5 km from the road  (Lgov – Konyshyovka), 11 km from the road of intermunicipal significance  (38K-017 – Nikolayevka – Shirkovo), on the road  (38K-023 – Olshanka – Marmyzhi – 38N-362), 7 km from the nearest railway halt 565 km (railway line Navlya – Lgov-Kiyevsky).

The rural locality is situated 61 km from Kursk Vostochny Airport, 150 km from Belgorod International Airport and 264 km from Voronezh Peter the Great Airport.

References

Notes

Sources

Rural localities in Lgovsky District